White spirit is a petroleum-derived liquid.

White spirit may also refer to:
 White Spirit (band), a heavy metal band from England
 "The White Spirit", a 2012 Hell on Wheels episode
 Baijiu, a Chinese liquor sometimes called white spirit